The Great Northern Conference is a high school athletic conference in the Wisconsin Interscholastic Athletic Association. It comprises seven teams from Marathon, Taylor, Lincoln, Oneida, Langlade and Vilas counties in Northern Wisconsin. The Conference was formed in 2008 with former Lumberjack members Lakeland, Medford, Northland Pines and Tomahawk, Cloverbelt member Mosinee, and Wisconsin Valley's Antigo and Merrill. In 2010, Merrill returned to the Wisconsin Valley conference and Rhinelander took its place.

Charter Members

Other Affiliated Members

 Colby coops with Abbotsford, and Ladysmith, Bruce and Flambeau co-op for Girls Swimming.
 Stevens Point and Wisconsin Rapids co-op for Girls Hockey.
 Mosinee, Wausau West, DC Everest, and Wausau East form the Central Wisconsin Storm in Girls Hockey.
 Rhinelander and Antigo co-op for Girls Hockey.
 Beginning in 2015 Wittenberg-Birnamwood will compete in the Bay Conference for Girls Swimming.

Conference Champions

Football

2008 Lakeland & Antigo
2009 Merrill
2010 Antigo
2011 Mosinee
2012 Medford & Mosinee
2013 Medford
2014 Merrill
2015 Antigo & Medford
2016 Antigo, Medford & Merrill
2017 Antigo
2018 Ashland
2019 Medford

Volleyball

2008 Merrill
2009 Merrill
2010 Mosinee & Tomahawk
2011 Tomahawk
2012 Rhinelander
2013 Tomahawk
2014 Tomahawk
2015 Medford
2016 Medford
2017 Mosinee
2018 Mosinee
2019 Mosinee

Girls Swimming

2008 Colby/Abbotsford
2009 Ladysmith/Bruce/Flambeau
2010 Ladysmith/Bruce/Flambeau
2011 Medford
2012 Lakeland
2013 Ladysmith/Bruce/Flambeau
2014 Tomahawk
2015 Tomahawk
2016 Tomahawk
2017 Tomahawk
2018 Tomahawk
2019 Rhinelander

Boys Soccer

2008 Northland Pines
2009 Northland Pines
2010 Rhinelander
2011 Northland Pines
2012 Rhinelander
2013 Northland Pines
2014 Lakeland & Rhinelander
2015 Rhinelander
2016 Rhinelander
2017 Rhinelander
2018 Northland Pines
2019 Northland Pines

Boys Cross Country

2008 Tomahawk
2009 Lakeland
2010 Lakeland
2011 Lakeland
2012 Lakeland
2013 Lakeland
2014 Lakeland
2015 Lakeland
2016 Lakeland
2017 Lakeland
2018 Medford
2019 Tomahawk

Girls Cross Country

2008 Tomahawk
2009 Tomahawk
2010 Tomahawk
2011 Tomahawk
2012 Tomahawk
2013 Lakeland
2014 Tomahawk
2015 Lakeland
2016 Lakeland
2017 Medford
2018 Medford
2019 Medford

Girls Tennis

2009 Columbus Catholic & Lakeland
2010 Rhinelander
2011 Rhinelander & Columbus Catholic
2012 Rhinelander
2013 Rhinelander
2014 Rhinelander
2015 Rhinelander
2016 Rhinelander
2017 Antigo
2018 Rhinelander
2019 Rhinelander

Girls Basketball

2008-2009 Antigo & Merrill
2009-2010 Medford
2010-2011 Lakeland
2011-2012 Medford
2012-2013 Northland Pines & Medford
2013-2014 Mosinee
2014-2015 Lakeland
2015-2016 Mosinee
2016-2017 Lakeland
2017-2018 Lakeland
2018-2019 Rhinelander
2019-2020 Rhinelander

Boys Basketball

2008-2009 Antigo
2009-2010 Antigo
2010-2011 Antigo
2011-2012 Antigo
2012-2013 Rhinelander
2013-2014 Rhinelander
2014-2015 Rhinelander
2015-2016 Mosinee & Rhinelander
2016-2017 Medford
2017-2018 Rhinelander
2019-2019 Mosinee
2019-2020 Medford

Wrestling

2008-2009 Mosinee
2009-2010 Merrill
2010-2011 Medford
2011-2012 Tomahawk
2012-2013 Tomahawk
2013-2014 Rhinelander
2014-2015 Rhinelander
2015-2016 Rhinelander & Tomahawk
2016-2017 Medford
2017-2018 Rhinelander
2018-2019 Medford
2019-2020 Medford

Girls Hockey

2008-2009
2010-2009 Central Wisconsin Co-Op
2010-2011 Central Wisconsin Co-Op
2011-2012 Stevens Point/Rapids Co-Op
2012-2013 Marshfield & Northland Pines
2013-2014 Northland Pines
2014-2015 Waupaca 
2015-2016 Northland Pines
2016-2017 Northland Pines
2017-2018 Lakeland/Tomahawk Co-op
2018-2019 Northland Pines

Boys Hockey

2008-2009 Lakeland
2009-2010 Waupaca
2010-2011 Waupaca
2011-2012 Northland Pines
2012-2013 Northland Pines
2013-2014 Antigo
2014-2015 Antigo
2015-2016 Antigo
2016-2017 Antigo
2017-2018 Northland Pines
2018-2019 Northland Pines

Gymnastics

2008-2009
2009-2010
2010-2011 Antigo
2011-2012 Stevens Point & Rhinelander
2012-2013 Stevens Point & Rhinelander
2013-2014 Stevens Point
2014-2015 Stevens Point & Chequamegon 
2015-2016 Rhinelander & Stevens Point
2016-2017 Ashland, Mosinee, & Stevens Point
2017-2018 Stevens Point & Rhinelander
2018-2019 Medford, Marshfield & Stevens Point

Boys Swimming

2011-2012 Rhinelander
2012-2013 Lakeland
2013-2014 Lakeland
2014-2015 Shawano
2015-2016 Rhinelander
2016-2017 Lakeland
2017-2018 Lakeland
2018-2019 Rhindelander

Baseball

2009 Merrill
2010 Merrill
2011 Rhinelander
2012 Rhinelander
2013 Antigo
2014 Antigo
2015 Antigo & Mosinee
2016 Antigo
2017 Antigo
2018 Antigo
2019 Medford

Softball

2009 Mosinee & Merrill
2010 Mosinee & Medford
2011 Mosinee
2012 Mosinee & Rhinelander
2013 Mosinee
2014 Mosinee
2015 Mosinee
2016 Mosinee
2017 Mosinee
2018 Mosinee
2019 Mosinee

Girls Track

2009 Tomahawk
2010 Mosinee
2011 Lakeland
2012 Lakeland
2013 Lakeland
2014 Tomahawk
2015 Lakeland
2016 Lakeland
2017 Lakeland
2018 Medford
2019 Medford

Boys Track

2009 Merrill
2010 Lakeland
2011 Lakeland
2012 Lakeland
2013 Lakeland
2014 Lakeland
2015 Lakeland
2016 Lakeland
2017 Lakeland
2018 Lakeland
2019 Rhinelander

Girls Soccer

2009 Northland Pines
2010 Northland Pines
2011 Lakeland
2012 Rhinelander
2013 Rhinelander
2014 Rhinelander
2015 Rhinelander
2016 Rhinelander
2017 Rhinelander
2018 Ashland
2019 Ashland

Boys Golf

2009 Mosinee
2010 Antigo
2011 Rhinelander
2012 Antigo
2013 Antigo
2014 Lakeland
2015 Antigo
2016 Medford 
2017 Medford
2018 Lakeland
2019 Lakeland

Boys Tennis

2010 Antigo
2011 Rhinelander
2012 Rhinelander
2013 Antigo
2014 Rhinelander
2015 Rhinelander
2016 Rhinelander
2017 Rhinelander
2018 Rhinelander
2019 Rhinelander

External links
Great Northern Conference Website
Wisconsin Interscholastic Athletic Association

Wisconsin high school sports conferences
High school sports conferences and leagues in the United States